María Muñoz Juan (born 21 September 1984) is a former Spanish female handballer. She was member of the Spanish national team.

In 2012 she left the Spanish league to sign for the French team Union Mios Biganos/Bègles.

References 

Living people
1984 births
Spanish female handball players
Sportspeople from Valencia
Competitors at the 2013 Mediterranean Games
Expatriate handball players
Spanish expatriate sportspeople in France
Mediterranean Games competitors for Spain
21st-century Spanish women